The New South Wales Golf Club is a links-style golf course designed by Alister MacKenzie in December 1926. It consists of 18 holes, two of which are beside the Tasman Sea and Botany Bay. The course is situated in La Perouse, New South Wales, a suburb of Sydney, and regularly rates in the top 50 golf courses in the world.

MacKenzie, on designing the course, stated:
A unique feature of the course design is that it has four par-five holes and four par-three holes and each of these is oriented north, south, east and west. 

It has hosted numerous professional tournaments, including the 2009 Australian Open; won by Adam Scott.

See also

List of golf courses in New South Wales

References

External links

New South Wales Golf Club Profile, Golf Australia
Detailed look

1926 establishments in Australia
Sports clubs established in 1926
Sports venues completed in 1926
Golf clubs and courses in New South Wales
Golf clubs and courses designed by Alister MacKenzie
Sporting clubs in Sydney
Sports venues in Sydney
La Perouse, New South Wales